Ramla is a city in Israel.

Ramla or similar names, derived from Ramal or Rimal (الرمل; Arabic for sand), may refer to:

Ramala, a village in India
Ramallah, a Palestinian city in the West Bank
Ramla Bay, bay in Malta
Ramleh, Iran (disambiguation)
La Rambla, Barcelona, Catalan name derived from the same linguistic Arab origin
Remla, a town in Tunisia
Rimal, a neighborhood of Gaza

See also